The CSA Steaua București Canoe-Kayak section  was created in 1949 and is one of the most successful canoe-kayak teams in Romania.

European champions

World champions

Olympic champions

References

External links
 Official CSA Steaua website
 Club website

canoe-kayak
Sports clubs established in 1949